In seven-dimensional geometry, a runcinated 7-simplex is a convex uniform 7-polytope with 3rd order truncations (runcination) of the regular 7-simplex.

There are 8 unique runcinations of the 7-simplex with permutations of truncations, and cantellations.

Runcinated 7-simplex

Alternate names
 Small prismated octaexon (acronym: spo) (Jonathan Bowers)

Coordinates 
The vertices of the runcinated 7-simplex can be most simply positioned in 8-space as permutations of (0,0,0,0,1,1,1,2). This construction is based on facets of the runcinated 8-orthoplex.

Images

Biruncinated 7-simplex

Alternate names
 Small biprismated octaexon (sibpo) (Jonathan Bowers)

Coordinates 
The vertices of the biruncinated 7-simplex can be most simply positioned in 8-space as permutations of (0,0,0,1,1,1,2,2). This construction is based on facets of the biruncinated 8-orthoplex.

Images

Runcitruncated 7-simplex

Alternate names
 Prismatotruncated octaexon (acronym: patto) (Jonathan Bowers)

Coordinates 
The vertices of the runcitruncated 7-simplex can be most simply positioned in 8-space as permutations of (0,0,0,0,1,1,2,3). This construction is based on facets of the runcitruncated 8-orthoplex.

Images

Biruncitruncated 7-simplex

Alternate names
 Biprismatotruncated octaexon (acronym: bipto) (Jonathan Bowers)

Coordinates 
The vertices of the biruncitruncated 7-simplex can be most simply positioned in 8-space as permutations of (0,0,0,1,1,2,3,3). This construction is based on facets of the biruncitruncated 8-orthoplex.

Images

Runcicantellated 7-simplex

Alternate names
 Prismatorhombated octaexon (acronym: paro) (Jonathan Bowers)

Coordinates 

The vertices of the runcicantellated 7-simplex can be most simply positioned in 8-space as permutations of (0,0,0,0,1,2,2,3). This construction is based on facets of the runcicantellated 8-orthoplex.

Images

Biruncicantellated 7-simplex

Alternate names
 Biprismatorhombated octaexon (acronym: bipro) (Jonathan Bowers)

Coordinates 
The vertices of the biruncicantellated 7-simplex can be most simply positioned in 8-space as permutations of (0,0,0,1,2,2,3,3). This construction is based on facets of the biruncicantellated 8-orthoplex.

Images

Runcicantitruncated 7-simplex

Alternate names
 Great prismated octaexon (acronym: gapo) (Jonathan Bowers)

Coordinates 
The vertices of the runcicantitruncated 7-simplex can be most simply positioned in 8-space as permutations of (0,0,0,0,1,2,3,4). This construction is based on facets of the runcicantitruncated 8-orthoplex.

Images

Biruncicantitruncated 7-simplex

Alternate names
 Great biprismated octaexon (acronym: gibpo) (Jonathan Bowers)

Coordinates 
The vertices of the biruncicantitruncated 7-simplex can be most simply positioned in 8-space as permutations of (0,0,0,1,2,3,4,4). This construction is based on facets of the biruncicantitruncated 8-orthoplex.

Images

Related polytopes 

These polytopes are among 71 uniform 7-polytopes with A7 symmetry.

Notes

References
 H.S.M. Coxeter: 
 H.S.M. Coxeter, Regular Polytopes, 3rd Edition, Dover New York, 1973 
 Kaleidoscopes: Selected Writings of H.S.M. Coxeter, edited by F. Arthur Sherk, Peter McMullen, Anthony C. Thompson, Asia Ivic Weiss, Wiley-Interscience Publication, 1995,  
 (Paper 22) H.S.M. Coxeter, Regular and Semi Regular Polytopes I, [Math. Zeit. 46 (1940) 380-407, MR 2,10]
 (Paper 23) H.S.M. Coxeter, Regular and Semi-Regular Polytopes II, [Math. Zeit. 188 (1985) 559-591]
 (Paper 24) H.S.M. Coxeter, Regular and Semi-Regular Polytopes III, [Math. Zeit. 200 (1988) 3-45]
 Norman Johnson Uniform Polytopes, Manuscript (1991)
 N.W. Johnson: The Theory of Uniform Polytopes and Honeycombs, Ph.D. 
  x3o3o3x3o3o3o - spo, o3x3o3o3x3o3o - sibpo, x3x3o3x3o3o3o - patto, o3x3x3o3x3o3o - bipto, x3o3x3x3o3o3o - paro, x3x3x3x3o3o3o - gapo, o3x3x3x3x3o3o- gibpo

External links 
 Polytopes of Various Dimensions
 Multi-dimensional Glossary

7-polytopes